Ale Pyinthe (lit. "Queen of the Central Palace") was a queen consort of kings Saw Rahan II and Kunhsaw Kyaunghpyu of the Pagan Dynasty of Myanmar. She was also the mother of King Sokkate.

According to the royal chronicles, she was of royal descent and had an elder sister and a younger sister. She and her two sisters were married off to King Saw Rahan. Her two  sisters became known as Taung Pyinthe ("Queen of Southern Palace") and Myauk Pyinthe ("Queen of the Northern Palace") while she received the title, Ale Pyinthe ("Queen of the Central Palace").

References

Bibliography
 
 

Queens consort of Pagan
11th-century Burmese women
10th-century Burmese women